WLPM-LP (95.7 FM) is a radio station licensed to Christmas, Florida, United States.  The station is currently owned by Orange Blossom Community Media Association.

References

External links
 

LPM-LP
LPM-LP